Alonzo Sheck "Shack" Shealy (June 1, 1873 – October 24, 1929) was an American college football player and coach. He served as the head football coach at Clemson University in 1904 and is the only Clemson graduate to be head football coach of his alma mater. A member of Clemson's first football team in 1896, Shealy served as team captain in 1898.

Biography
Shealy was born June 1, 1873, at Etheridge, South Carolina, in what is now known as Saluda County (formerly part of Edgefield County). His father, J. Edward Shealy, was a well-to-do planter of Edgefield, his mother was Miss Frances Linder, of Lexington.  Shealy attended public schools of this County until February 1894, when he entered Clemson Agricultural College of South Carolina, in June 1894; graduated 1899 with a Bachelor of Science degree.

"He decided to take the agricultural course and has pursued it to a successful completion.  He has been honored with the highest office in the corps, being appointed Senior Captain in February 1898. He has been president of the Columbian Society, was captain of the '98 foot ball [sic] team, holding the position of left end in a manner that left nothing to be desired.

"After graduation Mr. Shealy expects to make a specialty of Veterinary Science.

"Characteristic: A fondness for, but extreme diffidence toward the fair sex."

Entered Iowa State College at Ames, March 1900- taking degree Doctor of Veterinary Medicine, June 1903; at Clemson Agricultural College of South Carolina as Assistant Veterinarian in 1904. Played four years as a Tiger, and two more years for Iowa State.  He was hired in the fall of 1904 to replace Coach John Heisman who had accepted Georgia Tech's offer to become head of athletics at the institute in November 1903.   He holds the distinction of being the only Clemson player to have been head  coach at his alma mater. Shealy coached Clemson one year and guided the Tigers to a 3–3–1 record overall, which included wins over Alabama, Georgia, and Tennessee, giving him a .500 winning percentage.

He died on October 24, 1929.

Head coaching record

References

External links
 

1873 births
1929 deaths
19th-century players of American football
American football ends
Clemson Tigers football coaches
Clemson Tigers football players
People from Saluda County, South Carolina
Players of American football from South Carolina